Wang Fei (born February 20, 1982, in Harbin, Heilongjiang) is a Chinese female speed skater.

She competed for China at the 2010 Winter Olympics in the 1500m and 3000m events.

References

1982 births
Living people
Chinese female speed skaters
Olympic speed skaters of China
Sportspeople from Harbin
Speed skaters at the 2006 Winter Olympics
Speed skaters at the 2010 Winter Olympics
Asian Games medalists in speed skating
Speed skaters at the 2003 Asian Winter Games
Speed skaters at the 2007 Asian Winter Games
Speed skaters at the 2011 Asian Winter Games
Medalists at the 2007 Asian Winter Games
Medalists at the 2011 Asian Winter Games
Asian Games gold medalists for China
Asian Games silver medalists for China
Asian Games bronze medalists for China
20th-century Chinese women
21st-century Chinese women